Aksu (Aqsu) is a village in Almaty Region of south-eastern Kazakhstan. It is located directly north of Zhansugirov. DJ and record producer Imanbek, notable for his 2019 remix of SAINt JHN's song "Roses", is from Aksu.

External links
Tageo.com

Populated places in Almaty Region